The Great British Bake Off is a British television baking competition, produced by Love Productions. It premiered on BBC Two in 2010, then moved to BBC One in 2014, and then moved to Channel 4 in 2017. This list contains sections about annual winners and runners-up who appeared in the first seven series that aired on BBC.

The information seen in tables, including age and occupation, are based on the time of filming.

Series 1 (2010)

No baker was awarded Star Baker this season.

Edd Kimber (winner)
Edd Kimber (born 7 March 1985 in Bradford), the winner of the first series in 2010, previously worked as a debt collector for a bank at the time of original airing. Since then, Kimber has written the following cookbooks: The Boy Who Bakes (2011), Say It with Cake (2012), Patisserie Made Simple (2014),  One Tin Bakes (2020), One Tin Bakes Easy (2021), and Small Batch Bakes (2022). He was "resident baker" on The Alan Titchmarsh Show.

He came out while attending a university and lives in Highbury, North London, with his male partner.

Miranda Gore Browne
Miranda Gore Browne, eliminated in the finals of the first series, was a buyer of Marks & Spencer at the time of original airing. As of 2017, she is a consultant for the National Trust and ambassador for Aga Rangemaster Group. She also hosts baking classes in West Sussex. She wrote her cookbooks Biscuit (2012) and Bake Me a Cake As Fast As You Can (2014). She also appeared in a video A Perfect Afternoon Tea (2014).

Ruth Clemens
Ruth Clemens, runner-up of the first series, established her blog The Pink Whisk, which Kate Watson-Smyth of The Independent ranked 49th out of fifty "best food websites" of 2011.

Series 2 (2011)

There was no Star Baker on the seventh week as Paul and Mary felt singling out one baker when the results were incredibly close would not be right.

Jo Wheatley (winner)
Joanne Wheatley (née Rutland; born 27 May 1969), the winner of the second series, has started her own cookery school and written two cookbooks A Passion For Baking (2013) and Home Baking (2014). She has appeared in The One Show, performed cooking demonstrations on The Alan Titchmarsh Show and written a column in the Sainsbury's magazine. She writes for The Sun and various food publications.

Wheatley is married to Richard, who was sentenced on 20 April 2010 to seven years in prison for a £60-million money laundering scheme. They have three sons together.

Holly Bell
Holly Bell, one of runners-up of the second series, worked in an advertising industry at the time of original airing. She wrote her cookbook Recipes from a Normal Mum (2014)

Mary-Anne Boermans
Mary-Anne Boermans (born 1964/65), one of runners-up of the second series, had been a housewife at the time of original airing and previously played women's rugby for Wales. She wrote her cookbook Great British Bakes (2013) and runs a blog Time to Cook.

Series 3 (2012)

There was no elimination the sixth week after John sustained a major injury to his finger and could not complete the last bake. The judges determined it would be unfair to eliminate anyone.

John Whaite (winner)

John Whaite (born 1988/89), winner of the third series, was a University of Manchester graduate student studying law at the time of the series. Whaite was raised in Wigan. He also has two older sisters. He attended the University of Oxford twice.

After Bake Off, Whaite graduated with a law degree. He then attended London school of Le Cordon Bleu.

In January 2016, Whaite also established his eponymous cookery school, John Whaite's Kitchen Cookery School, a converted 400-year-old barn on his family's farm in Wrightington, Lancashire. He appeared in ITV's Lorraine, This Morning, What's Cooking?, The Alan Titchmarsh Show and Sunday Brunch. He also co-presented ITV's cooking competition series Chopping Block with Rosemary Shrager in 2016–17. He also regularly appeared as a guest of presenter Steph McGovern's Channel 4 talk show Steph's Packed Lunch.

Whaite announced his engagement with his partner Paul Atkins, a graphic designer, in July 2017.

Whaite was a contestant on the nineteenth series (2021) of Strictly Come Dancing, appearing as part of the first ever male same-sex pairing with professional Johannes Radebe. Whaite and Radebe in December 2021 became one of two finalist pairs but then lost the contest to another pair, actress Rose Ayling-Ellis and dancer Giovanni Pernice, via public vote.

Whaite wrote the following cookbooks: John Whaite Bakes (2013), John Whaite Bakes at Home (2014), Perfect Plates in 5 Ingredients (2016), Comfort: Food to Soothe the Soul (2018), and A Flash in the Pan (2019).

Brendan Lynch
Brendan Lynch (born 1948/49), runner-up of the third series, was a semi-retired company director at the time of the series. Two years after Bake Off, in 2014, Lynch was treated in four months for his chronic ulcerative colitis, to which he attributed stress during the Bake Off filming and consumption of his own bakes. Since then, he consumed nutritional supplements and reduced use of sugar, lactose and gluten in order to control the condition.

James Morton

James Morton (born 1990/91), runner-up of the third series, was a University of Glasgow medical student when he first competed. When originally aired, he became a fan favourite for "his relaxed, laid-back approach and love of experimentation". In the finals week, his Signature bake's bottom was "soggy", and he baked five cakes instead of only one as instructed for his Showstopper, both of which failed to impress the judges.

Since then, Morton graduated from the University with a medical degree in March 2015, qualifying him a doctor. He also established his blog containing his recipes. He is the son of Tom Morton, a broadcaster.

Morton re-competed against Chetna Makan (series five), Howard Middleton (series four), and Janet Basu (series two) in the Boxing Day episode of The Great Christmas Bake Off 2016 special. Makan was crowned the episode's winner.

Morton wrote cookbooks Brilliant Bread (2013), How Baking Works (2015), Brew: The Foolproof Guide to Making World-Class Beer at Home (2016), Shetland: Cooking on the Edge of the World (2018) with his father Tom as co-writer, Super Sourdough (2020), Sourdough from Scratch (2021), and Brew from Scratch (2021). His book Brilliant Bread won the Cookery Book of the Year Award at the 2014 Guild of Food Writers Awards. The 2018 critically-acclaimed book Shetland was criticised by some over what they perceived as a negative portrayal of Shetlanders, particularly Morton's poem.

Morton also wrote baking columns for a Scottish tabloid Sunday Mail.

Morton applied one of his brews Oatmeal Extra Pale, commercially produced by Dark Star Brewing Company, for the now-defunct National Home Brewing Awards in 2014.

Series 4 (2013)

Frances Quinn (winner)

Frances Elizabeth Quinn (born 1981) is a British baker and children's clothing designer from Market Harborough who won the fourth series in 2013. Her first book release was Quinntessential Baking.

Quinn is an ambassador of the Cream Tea Society and is a frequent guest on UK radio and TV. She has appeared on the pages of Vogue, has baked for illustrator Quentin Blake, and has appeared on Pointless Celebrities with 2014 GBBO runner-up Richard Burr. Other clients include Jools Holland and Wimbledon Tennis Club.

In May 2020, it was reported that Quinn had been banned from Waitrose for shoplifting. An officer representing Leicestershire Police stated: "She admitted her involvement to officers and the matter was dealt with by way of a community resolution”.

She is the youngest of five siblings, having three brothers and one sister.

Ruby Tandoh

Ruby Tandoh (born 1991/92), runner-up of the fourth series, was a first-year University College London student studying history and art at the time of filming. She was also a former model. Her grandfather came from Ghana. She grew up in Southend-on-Sea, Essex. Her mother is a school administrator; her father, a Royal Mail staff. She has three younger siblings.

Allegations arose regarding Paul Hollywood's favouritism toward Ruby Tandoh, resulting in personal attacks against Tandoh including by the chef Raymond Blanc. Both Hollywood and Tandoh denied the accusation. After Bake Off, Tandoh has written column articles for The Guardian, The New Yorker, Financial Times, and Vice.

Tandoh wrote cookbooks Crumb (2014), Flavour (2016), Eat Up! (2018), Breaking Eggs (2021), and Cook As You Are (2022). She also wrote an essay "Tikim Nang Tikim" for a collection book In the Kitchen (2020).

Tandoh admitted her many years of eating disorder in a 2016 interview. She also wrote a one-off magazine Do What You Want, whose profits went to charities, including ones tackling eating disorders.

Tandoh came out as bisexual in a 2018 interview with The Times. She married her partner Leah Pritchard in September 2018.

Kimberley Wilson

Kimberley Wilson (born 1982/83), runner-up of the fourth series, was a psychologist at the time of filming. Wilson was born when her mother was 22; Wilson's brother was born five years prior. Their single mother raised both Kimberley and her brother in East London.

After Bake Off, Wilson has run a private clinic in Central London and wrote a self-help book How to Build a Healthy Brain (2020), her first book. She hosts her own podcast Stronger Minds, which debuted in 2020. She and Xand van Tulleken co-host a BBC psychology-based podcast Made of Stronger Stuff, which debuted in 2021.

Series 5 (2014)

Because the judges were unable to agree, no one was eliminated on the sixth week.

Nancy Birtwhistle (winner)
Nancy Birtwhistle (born ) is a British baker who, in winning the fifth series in 2014 at the age of 60, became the oldest winner of The Great British Bake Off. Birtwhistle – a grandmother of eight – had applied to appear in the program in 2013 but was unsuccessful. She now contributes to national papers such as The Daily Telegraph, has her own website, and gives baking demonstrations across the UK.  Before taking baking up seriously, Birtwhistle was a Practice Manager at a GP surgery. She was born in Hull, and lives in Barton-upon-Humber with her husband, Tim. In 2019, Birtwhistle released a cookbook, Sizzle & Drizzle: Tips for a Modern Day Home-maker. She also wrote Clean & Green: 101 Hints and Tips for a More Eco-Friendly Home (2021).

Richard Burr
Richard Burr (born 1975/76), one of runners-up of the fifth series, worked as a fourth-generation construction worker for his family building business, co-run by his father, at the time of the competition. At that same time, his mother worked as a bursar for a secondary school.

Burr attended Queen Elizabeth's School, Barnet, a boys' grammar school. When he was a teenager, he worked at a bakery in Mill Hill.

Burr graduated from Birkbeck, University of London in 2012 with his first-class honours degree in biodiversity and conservation. As of December 2019, he works in conservation.

Burr has a wife with three daughters.

Burr wrote BIY: Bake It Yourself, released on 27 August 2015. He also has his own blog (https://richardburr.london).

Luis Troyano
Luis Troyano (late 1971 – late October 2020), one of the runners-up of the fifth series, owned a graphic design business at the time of competition. He was born in Stockport, England to his Spanish-born parents, Maria and Manuel, who emigrated to the United Kingdom in the 1960s. He began working daily for his father's Italian restaurant after school at age 12. His father Manuel died of cancer when Luis was 16.

After Bake Off, Troyano wrote a 2015 cookbook Bake It Great. He opened The Hive Bakery in Poynton, Cheshire in 2016.

In April 2019, Troyano had a cancer surgery, which he mentioned on Twitter. As confirmed by his agent on 5 November 2020 via Twitter, he died of esophageal cancer at age 48 on the week of 25 October 2020. Until his death, he was married to his wife Louise, also a graphic designer.

Series 6 (2015)

Nadiya Hussain (winner)

Nadiya Jamir Hussain  (née Begum; born 25 December 1984), the winner of the sixth series, was a full-time mother and housewife at the time of the competition. Also, at the time, she lived in Leeds with her husband Abdal—an IT specialist—and three children, and she studied for an Open University degree in Childhood and Youth Studies. Her appearance on the show and ensuing popularity with audiences were deemed important steps toward shifting stereotypes about the Muslim community and acceptance about cultural diversity.

Hussain is a second-generation British Bangladeshi, born and raised in Luton, Bedfordshire, where she attended Beech Hill Primary School, Challney High School and Luton Sixth Form College. She has five siblings: three sisters and two brothers. Her father, who originates from Beanibazar, was a chef and owned an Indian restaurant.

After Bake Off, the Hussains moved to Milton Keynes nearer to London in order for Nadiya to pursue a culinary career. Nadiya also worked as a contributing editor of BBC Good Food. She also wrote her debut cookbook Nadiya's Kitchen (2016); children's books Nadiya's Bake Me A Story (2016) and Nadiya's Bake Me a Festive Story (2017), both of which also contains recipes; her novel The Secret Lives of the Amir Sisters (2017); and her autobiography Finding My Voice (2019).

Hussain appeared in her television shows The Chronicles of Nadiya (2016), Nadiya's British Food Adventure (2017), Nadiya's Family Favourites (2018), Time to Eat (2019), Nadiya Bakes (2020), and Nadiya's Fast Flavors (2021). She also appeared as one of judges for the fourth series of Junior Bake Off on CBBC.

In 2016, Nadiya was given the opportunity to bake the official cake for Queen Elizabeth's 90th birthday. She was appointed Member of the Order of the British Empire (MBE) in the 2020 New Year Honours for services to broadcasting and the culinary arts.

Ian Cumming
Ian Cumming (born 1972/73), one of runner-ups of the sixth series, has been a travel photographer since the 1990s. Cumming's pictures appeared in various publications like National Geographic and British Airways ad campaigns. His father was an engineer.

Cumming lives in Cambridgeshire with his wife, who is a doctor, and two children (one daughter and one son).

Tamal Ray
Tamal Ray (born 1985/86), one of runner-ups of the sixth series, was a trainee anaesthetist at the time of the competition. His parents emigrated from India to the United Kingdom in the 1970s. Ray moved to Manchester with his parents while attending the Haberdashers' Aske's Boys' School (Habs). He graduated from the Habs in 2004 and then from King's College London with a bachelor's degree in Medicine.

After Bake Off, Ray appeared in one of January 2016 episodes of BBC's This Week supporting junior doctors' strike amidst government negotiations over pay and working conditions. He also appeared in a one-episode medical programme Be Your Own Doctor (2016) with co-host Kate Quilton. He also has written columns and published his recipes for The Guardian.

Ray re-competed for the 2018–19 New Year's special against other previous contestants Candice Brown (series seven, winner), Kate Henry (series five), and Steven Carter-Bailey (series eight). Carter-Bailey was crowned the winner of that special. He and another Bake Off contestant Kim-Joy of the ninth series attended the finale screening of the first series (2019) of RuPaul's Drag Race UK.

Ray publicly came out as gay in autumn 2015.

Series 7 (2016)

Candice Brown (winner)
Candice Brown (born 21 December 1984), the winner of the seventh series, was a PE teacher at Ashlyns School at the time of the competition. In her victory speech she attributed her success to starting baking at four years old.

Brown graduated from the University of Birmingham with a Bachelor's degree in teaching. As reported in November 2016, after Bake Off, she left her job as a PE teacher at Ashlyns School, Berkhamsted in order to pursue a career in baking.

She wrote the cookbooks Comfort: Delicious Bakes and Family Treats (2017) and Happy Cooking (2021).

Brown occasionally cooks on the ITV daytime programme This Morning. She took part in the tenth series of Dancing on Ice on ITV in 2018, in which she was partnered with Matt Evers.  In 2019 she appeared in The Great New Year's Bake Off and on Celebrity Mastermind, which she won having taken Audrey Hepburn as her specialist subject.

In 2018, Brown worked for a short time in the pub kitchen of Tom Kerridge before taking up the lease, with her brother Ben, of the Green Man pub in Eversholt, Bedfordshire.

Brown announced her split from her husband Liam Macauley in June 2020, whom she married in 2018.

Jane Beedle
Jane Beedle (born 1954/55), one of runner-ups of the seventh series, is a garden designer. Her company has worked on London gardens, including ones of Bromley. Beedle's grandfather owned a bakery in Hastings. She has a younger brother. She also has a husband with a son and a daughter.

Beedle re-competed against Andrew Smyth (series seven), Liam Charles (series eight), and Flo Atkins (series eight) in the 2018 Christmas special of Bake Off. She was crowned the special's winner.<ref name="Christmas2018">{{cite news |first=Ash |last=Percival |date=25 December 2018 |title=Great British Bake Off'''s Christmas Special Was the Perfect Mixture Of Ingredients, Even If Flo's Cake Wasn't |url=https://www.huffingtonpost.co.uk/entry/great-british-bake-off-christmas-special-huffpost-verdict_uk_5c1cd37ee4b0407e9079ad85 |work=HuffPost UK |access-date=8 May 2021 }}</ref>

Andrew Smyth

Andrew Michael Smyth (born 1990/91), one of runners-up of the seventh series, is an aerospace engineer for Rolls-Royce Holdings in Derby, designing jet engines. He was born in County Down, Northern Ireland, to his parents Nigel and Kay and has one brother, Jamie. He sings tenor especially for a choir group in Derby.

Smyth graduated from Sidney Sussex College, Cambridge in 2013 with a degree in Engineering.

Smyth re-competed against Jane Beedle (series seven), Liam Charles (series eight), and Flo Atkins (series) in the 2018 Christmas special of Bake Off. Beedle was crowned the special's winner.

In 2021, Smyth was one of the executive producers of a Netflix baking competition series called Baking Impossible''. He also served as a judge on the show.

See also
 List of The Great British Bake Off contestants
 List of The Great British Bake Off Star Bakers

References

General

Specific

Further reading
 

Great British Bake Off finalists (series 1-7)
Year of birth missing (living people)